Tiger Prabhakar (30 March 1948 – 25 March 2001), also known as Kannada Prabhakar, was an Indian actor known for his works predominantly in Kannada and Telugu cinema, with a few Malayalam, Tamil and Bollywood films.

Career
Prabhakar started his film career by appearing in a negative role in small-budget movies.

Kanglish quotes
Prabhakar introduced Kanglish into Kannada movies. Kanglish is a mix of Kannada and English dialogues.

Death
He died in Mallya Hospital in Bangalore at 9:45 p.m. on 25 March 2001.

Films

As actor

 Kadina Rahasya (1967)
 Punya Purusha (1969)
 Mathrubhoomi (1969)
 Kallara Kalla (1970)
 Modala Rathri (1970)
 Baalu Belagithu (1970)
 Paropakari (1970)
 Mahadiya Mane (1970)
 Kasidre Kailasa (1971)
 Prathidhwani (1971)
 Triveni (1973)
 Cow Boy Kulla (1973)
 Gandhada Gudi (1973)
 Professor Huchuraya (1974)
 Anna Attige (1974)
 Kalla Kulla (1975)
 Bhagya Jyothi (1975)
 Naga Kanye (1975)
 Mayura (1975)
 Bangalore Bhootha (1976)
 Raja Nanna Raja (1976)
 Bangarada Gudi (1976)
 Badavara Bandhu (1976)
 Aparadhi (1976)
 Lakshmi Nivasa (1977)
 Giri Kanye (1977)
 Shrimanthana Magalu (1977)
 Sahodarara Savaal (1977)
 Olavu Geluvu (1977)
 Gaayathri (1977)
 Kittu Puttu (1977)
 Shankar Guru (1978)
 Premayana (1978)
 Operation Diamond Racket (1978)
 Vasantha Lakshmi (1978)
 Thayige Thakka Maga (1978)
 Lawyer Viswanath (1978) as Soda Jaggu
 Thai Meethu Sathiyam (1978)
 Seetharamu (1979)
 Huliya Haalina Mevu (1979)
 Pakka Kalla (1979)
 Preethi Madu Thamashe Nodu (1979)
 Vijay Vikram (1979)
 Putani Agent 123 (1979)
 Naniruvude Ninagagi (1979)
  Yugandhar
 Nanobba Kalla (1979) as Chandru
 Point Parimala (1980) as Cheeta
 Nanna Rosha Nooru Varusha (1980)
 Rama Parushurama (1980)
 Kaalinga (1980)
 Kulla Kulli (1980)
 Auto Raja (1980) as Rodrigues
 Ravichandra (1980)
 Prema Anuraga (1980)
 Moogana Sedu (1980)
 Haddina Kannu (1980)
 Simha Jodi (1980)
 Vasantha Geetha (1980)
 Aarada Gaaya (1980)
 Janma Janmada Anubandha (1980)
 Pattanakke Banda Pathniyaru (1980)
 Aadi Manava (1980)
 Anbukku Naan Adimai (1980; Tamil)
 Thayiya Madilalli (1981)
 Havina Hede (1981) ... Antony
 Antha (1981)
 Prachanda Putanigalu (1981)
 Naga Kala Bhairava (1981)
 Chattaniki Kallu Levu (1981) as Javed
 Geetha (1981) as astrologer
 Maha Prachandaru (1981)
 Devara Aata (1981)
 Ganesha Mahime (1981)
 Snehitara Savaal (1981)
 Bhaari Bharjari Bete (1981)
 Shikari (1981)
 Billa Ranga(1982)
 Chellida Raktha (1982)
 Sahasa Simha (1982)
 Archana (1982)
 Prema Matsara (1982)
 Mullina Gulabi (1982)
 Mutthinantha Atthige (1982)
 Benki Chendu (1982)
 Karmika Kallanalla (1982)
 Garuda Rekhe (1982)
 Boodi Mucchida Kenda (1982)
 Ajith (1982)
 Oorige Upakari (1982)
 Tony (1982)
 Jimmy Gallu (1982)
 Nyaya Ellide (1982)
 Nanna Devaru (1982)
 Kannu Theresida Hennu (1982)
 Khadeema Kallaru (1982) ... Ravi
 Simhasana (1983)
 Onde Guri (1983)
 Jaggu (1983)
 Nyaya Geddithu (1983)
 Chandi Chamundi (1983)
 Chakravyuha (1983) as Anil Kumar
 Dampathiyaru (1983)
 Sididedda Sahodara (1983)
 Kranthiyogi Basavanna (1983)
 Mutthaide Bhagya (1983)
 Geluvu Nannade (1983)
 Hasida Hebbuli (1983)
 Mududida Tavare Aralithu (1983)
 Gayathri Maduve (1983)
 Roshagadu(1983)
 Karune Illada Kanoonu (1983)
 Prema Yuddha (1983)
 Puli Bebbuli (1983)
 Dharma Poratam (1983) as Ranga
 Raktha Tilaka (1984)
 Huliyada Kala (1984)
 Vigneshwara Vahana (1984)
 Jiddu (1984)
 Thayi Nadu (1984)
 Huli Hejje (1984)
 Kanoonige Saval (1984)
 Premigala Saval (1984)
 Hosa Ithihasa (1984)
 Preethi Vathsalya (1984)
 Inquilaab (1984; Hindi) as Anil Raj
 Kadina Raja (1985)
 Pralaya Rudra (1985)
 Annai Bhoomi 3D (1985; Tamil)
 Sedina Hakki (1985)
 Jwala (1985;Telugu) as Sarvottama Rao
 Pattabhishekam (1985;Telugu)
 Swabhimana (1985)
 Thayi Mamathe (1985)
 Thayiye Nanna Devaru (1986)
 Kedi No. 1 (1986)
 Agni Parikshe (1986)
 Rakshasudu (1986;Telugu) as Vankachakra Ram Murthy
 Seelu Nakshathra (1986)
 Tiger (1986)
 Belli Naga (1986)
 Vikram (1986; Telugu) as Sardar
 Kirathakudu (1986) as Snake
 Aparadhi Nanalla (1986)
 Jawab Hum Denge (1987; Hindi)
 Premaloka (1987)
 Onde Goodina Hakkigalu (1987)
 Huli Hebbuli (1987)
 Sathwa Pareekshe (1987)
 Thaliya Aane (1987)
 Agni Parva (1987)
 Thandri Kodukula Challenge (1987)
 Muddayi (1987)
 Pasivadi Pranam (1987)
 Jebu Donga(1987; Telugu)
 Bedi (1987)
 Bandha Muktha (1987)
 Athiratha Maharatha (1987)
 Shakthi (1988)
 Kirathaka (1988)
 Vicky Dada (1988)
 Bharath (1988)
 Mathru Vathsalya (1988)
 Dharmathma  (1988)
 Nee Nanna Daiva (1988)
 Mutthinantha Manushya (1988)
 Bidisada Bandha (1989)
 Padma Vyuha (1989)
 Bangarada Baduku (1989)
 Idu Saadhya (1989)
 Onti Salaga (1989)
 Namma Bhoomi (1989)
 Hosa Kavya (1989)
 Raja Yuvaraja (1989)
 En Swamy Aliyandre (1989)
 Ranabheri (1990)
 Pundara Ganda (1990)
 Tiger Gangu (1990)
 Kodama Simham (1990)
 Kiladi Thatha (1990)
 Trinethra  (1990)
 Sididedda Gandu (1990)
 Raja Kempu Roja (1990)
 Ashoka Chakra (1990)
 Challenge (1990)
 Neti Siddhartha  (1990; Telugu) as Jogendar
 Jagadeka Veerudu Athiloka Sundari (1990; Telugu) ... K.P.
 Varagala Bete (1991)
 Prema Pareekshe (1991)
 CBI Vijay (1991)...Vijay 
 Keralida Kesari (1991)
 C. B. I. Shiva (1991)
 Central Rowdy (1991)
 Bombay Dada (1991)
 Mathru Bhagya (1991)
 Kiladi Gandu (1991)
 Kaliyuga Bheema (1991)
 Annamalai (1992; Tamil)
 Putta Hendthi (1992)
 Pandiyan (1992; Tamil)
 Samara Simha (1992)
 Belliyappa Bangarappa (1992)
 Vikram (1993)
 Mafia (1993; Malayalam) as Devaraja Gowda
 Rojavai Killathe (1993)
 Jaga Mechida Huduga (1993)
 Bhavya Bharatha (1993)
 Jwala (1993)
 Mahendra Varma (1993)
 Jailer Jagannath (1993)
 Kempaiah IPS (1993) as Halappa
 Dhruvam (1993; Malayalam) as Hyder Marakkar
 Nippu Ravva (1993; Telugu) as Prabhakar
 Time Bomb (1994)
 Karulina Koogu (1994)
 Gandhada Gudi Part 2 (1994)
 Mr. Mahesh Kumar (1994)
 Gopi Kalyana (1994)
 Mayor Prabhakar (1994) as Prabhakar 
 Chinnada Raja (1995)
 Yama Kinkara (1995)...Yamadharmaraja 
 Muthu (1995; Tamil)
 Chiranjeevi Rajegowda (1995)
 Mr. Vasu (1995)
 Boss (1996)...Bhaskar 
 Ranger (1996)
 Ranger (1997; Malayalam film)
 Cheluva (1997)
 Arjun Abhimanyu (1998)
 My Dear Tiger (1998)
 Marthanda (1998)
 King (1998)
 Khalanayaka (1999)
 Minchu (2000)
 Bombat Brothers (2000)
 Mysore Huli (2001) as Mahendra 
 Real Rowdy (2004)
 Good Bad Ugly (2005)

As director 

Good Bad Ugly (2005) (also composer)
Mysore Huli (2001) (also composer)
Yama Kinkara (1995)
Mr. Mahesh Kumar (1994)
Mahendra Varma (1993)
Kaliyuga Bheema (1991)
Bombay Daadaa (1991)
Shakthi (1988)
Bidisada bandha (1989)
Arjun Abhimanyu  (1997)
My dear Tiger (1998)

References

External links 
 

1950 births
2001 deaths
Male actors in Kannada cinema
Indian male film actors
20th-century Indian male actors
21st-century Indian male actors
Male actors in Tamil cinema
Male actors from Karnataka
20th-century Indian film directors
Kannada film directors
Male actors in Telugu cinema
Film directors from Karnataka
21st-century Indian film directors
People from Shimoga district